Duratrans were invented by Eastman Kodak Co. in the late 1970s and trademarked in 1982, to ascribe to their newly developed large-format backlit color transparency film, by shortening the material name of Endura Transparency. The original duratrans film was exposed photographically and developed chemically using a similar silver halide process as conventional lab photography.

Over time, the phrase duratrans has been genericized to apply to various large format backlit graphic substrates, imaged in a variety of ways including photochemical and various types of inkjets.

"Promotional" duratrans
The most common usage of duratrans is for the backlit graphic film used for promotional advertising displays in shopping malls, airports, casinos, movie theaters, restaurants, retail stores, trade show exhibit halls and any retail establishment that contains any number of backlit display lightboxes in which the printed duratrans graphic films must be inserted and illuminated, in order to gain the advantage of their backlightable property.

Promotional duratrans are imaged with advertising messages, product and lifestyle photos, informational and/or menu content, and/or virtually any printed content the user desires to display.

"Fine Art" duratrans
The distinction between promotional and fine art duratrans is purely in the subject matter of the artwork imaged onto the duratrans film. There is no other defining difference, except that possibly a fine art duratrans may be processed using higher resolutions, color depths, and/or other fabrication tolerances to effect a higher-precision result, for a more-demanding audience.

"Translite" duratrans

Another popular application of duratrans is as a photo backdrop in television news sets and theater designs. These duratrans, a.k.a. translites, are most often used to create the backgrounds that appear behind news presenters or anchors. In theatre the backgrounds are positioned behind the actors, actresses, and other talent respectively.

Translites can range from 15 to more than 100 feet long and 12 to 40 feet tall. The image is printed or painted on a translucent material such as polyester or a plastic sheet. This is then stretched vertically over an opening in the set's backwall which is designed to support it. Translites are lit from behind using lights mounted perpendicular to the floor in the space between the set and studio wall, illuminating the translite image and adding to the illusion of depth.

Translites are created by printing photographic images or computer-rendered images onto the material using large-format printers. These pieces are assembled into the final size by seaming. A matte lacquer is often added to dull the finish, to mitigate stage lighting reflections.

Translites for television news sets often contain photographs of city skylines, landscapes, the logos for the station and its network affiliation, control rooms, and abstract designs. Set areas designed for sports and weather portions of the newscasts contain weather, sports, and team logo imagery.

See also

Inkjet printing
Point of sale display
Set construction
Wide-format printer

References

Photographic films
Printing
Scenic design
Kodak